Philipp Nawrath (born 13 February 1993) is a German biathlete. He competed at the Biathlon World Championships 2019.

Biathlon results
All results are sourced from the International Biathlon Union.

Olympic Games

World Championships

*During Olympic seasons competitions are only held for those events not included in the Olympic program.
**The single mixed relay was added as an event in 2019.

References

External links

1993 births
Living people
German male biathletes
Sportspeople from Füssen
Biathletes at the 2022 Winter Olympics
Olympic biathletes of Germany
21st-century German people